See also Andreas Axelsson (criminal).

Andreas Axelsson is a Swedish musician, best known as a guitarist in progressive death metal band Edge of Sanity. Before he joined Edge of Sanity, Axelsson was the singer in black metal band Marduk, though he only appeared on their first release, Dark Endless.
In 2014 he joined Disfear where he currently is on bass duty.

Music
Disfear – bass (2014–)
Edge of Sanity – guitars (1989–1999), bass (1993), vocals (1993, 1997)
Infestdead – vocals (1996–2007)
Marduk – vocals (1990–1993)
Incapacity – vocals
Total Terror – vocals, guitar
Tortyr – guitar
Tormented – vocals, guitar
Necronaut – vocals
The Dontcares - bass, vocals, nudeness 
The Deadbeats – Vocals, guitar
The Long Way Home

References

Year of birth missing (living people)
Living people
Swedish heavy metal musicians